Latham may refer to:

Places

Australia
 Latham, Australian Capital Territory, a suburb of Canberra, Australia
 Latham, Western Australia

Tanzania
 Latham Island

United States
 Latham, Illinois, a small town
 Latham, Kansas, a small town
 Latham, New York, a hamlet in Colonie (town), New York and a suburb of Albany, New York
 Latham, Ohio, an unincorporated community
 Latham, Missouri, an unincorporated community
 Latham, Oregon, an unincorporated community
 Latham, Tennessee, an unincorporated community
 Latham Shale, California, a geologic formation
 Latham Square, a prominent downtown intersection in Oakland, California
 Latham, Massachusetts, the fictional setting for the final episode of Seinfeld

Companies
 Latham & Watkins, a global law firm
 Société Latham, a French aeronautical construction company

Other uses
 Latham (surname)
 The Latham Diaries, a memoir about politics in Australia
 Latham, a cultivar of raspberry with some resistance to raspberry spur blight
 Latham 47,  a French twin-engine flying boat
 a 1906 hotel in Manhattan, New York City, designed by Augustus N. Allen

See also
Lathom, a village in Lancashire, England, United Kingdom